This is a list of museums in Seychelles.

List
 National Museum of Natural History, Seychelles
 National Cultural Centre, Seychelles
 People's National Party Museum, Seychelles
 Praslin Museum
 Seychelles Natural History Museum
 Seychelles People Defence Forces Museum

See also
 List of museums

External links
 Seychelles Museums
 Museums in Seychelles

Seychelles
Museums
Seychelles
Museums